The Mahabharata is one of the two major Sanskrit epics of ancient India; it was composed by the sage Vyasa. The most important characters of Mahabharata can be said to include: Krishna; the Pandavas  Yudhishthira, Bhima, Arjuna, Nakula and Sahadeva, along with their wife Draupadi; and the Kauravas (who were a hundred brothers), led by the eldest brother, Duryodhana. The most important other characters include Bhishma, Karna, Dronacharya, Shakuni, Dhritrashtra, Gandhari and Kunti. Some pivotal additional characters include Balarama, Subhadra, Vidura, Abhimanyu, Kripacharya, Pandu, Satyavati, Ashwatthama and Amba. Deities who play a significant role in the epic include Vishnu, Brahma, Shiva, Ganga, Indra, Surya and Yama.

This list mentions notable characters and may also contain characters appearing in regional stories and folklores related to Mahabharata.

A

Abhimanyu 

Abhimanyu was the son of third Pandava prince Arjuna and Yadava princess Subhadra. He was a disciple of his maternal uncles Krishna and Balrama. He was killed unfairly on the 13th day of Kurukshetra War. In the war, Abhimanyu killed warriors including Rukmartha, Brihadbala, Laksmana (Duryodhana's son), Dushmanara (Dushyasana's 2nd son), 7 foster brothers of Karna, sons of Shalya, etc. and defeated mighty warriors including Ashwatthama, Kripa,Karna, Shalya, Duryodhana, Dushasana, etc. in direct and joint attacks when he had a bow in his hands. He was a great warrior just like his father Arjuna. He was among the most loved sons of Pandavas.

Adhiratha
Adhiratha was the foster father of Karna and the charioteer of Bheeshma. He was also the leader of all Sutas and royal charioteers. His wife was Radha. Shon was their biological son. As the Bhagavata Purana, Adhiratha descended from Yayati and therefore was related to Krishna. He was also the descendant of Romapada, the king of Anga and brother-in-law of Dashratha's descendant Shighra, king of Ayodhya.

Adrika
Adrika was an apsara, who was cursed to become a fish and only to be liberated when she gives birth to a human. Adrika, as a fish, lived in the river Yamuna. Once she came in contact with the semen of Uparichara and impregnated herself. After 10 month, some fishermen caught her, cut open her womb and found two children  Matsyagandha and Matsya. After the incident, Adrika was liberated from her curse and returned to heaven.

Agni

Agni is the Hindu god of fire. In the Vana Parva, sage Markandeya told the story of Agni's marriage.
In the Khandava-daha Parva, Agni in disguise approaches Krishna and Arjuna seeking sufficient food for gratification of his hunger and expressed his desire to consume the forest of Khandava protected by Indra for the sake of Takshaka, the chief of the Nagas. Aided by Krishna and Arjuna, Agni consumes the Khandava Forest. Later, as a boon, Arjuna got all his weapons from Indra and also the bow, Gandiva, from Varuna.

Alambusha 
Alambusha was a Rakshasa and younger brother of Baka and Kirmira. In the Kurukshetra War, he fought from the Kaurava side. During the war, he killed Iravan, son of Pandava prince Arjuna. Later, Alambusha was killed by Bhima's son, Ghatotkacha.

Alayudha 
He was a demon and friend of another demon named Alambusha. He and Alambusha were killed by Bhima's demon son Ghatotkacha during the Night war on the fourteenth day of the war.

Amba 

Amba was the eldest daughter of Kashya, the king of Kashi and the sister of Ambika and Ambalika. Amba was abducted by Kuru prince Bhishma and holds him responsible for her misfortune. Her sole goal in life becomes his destruction, to fulfill which she is reborn as Shikhandini/Shikhandi.

Ambalika 

Ambalika is the daughter of Kashya, the King of Kashi, and wife of Vichitravirya, the King of Hastinapur. She was also the  mother of Pandu, step mother of Dhritarashtra and grand mother of Pandavas.

Ambika

Ambika is the daughter of Kashya, the King of Kashi, and wife of Vichitravirya, the king of Hastinapura. She was also the mother of Dhritarashtra and stepmother of Pandu and grandmother to the Kauravas.

Ambika's maid
The chief maid of Ambika—named Parishrami in later retelling—was sent by Ambika and Ambalika to Maharishi Vyasa for Niyoga. From their union, Vidura was born.

Amitaujas
Amitaujas is the mighty warrior of Panchala Kingdom. He was the maharatha on the side of Pandavas.

Anjanaparvana
He was the son of Ghatotkacha and Mourvi. His grandparents were Bhima and Hidimbā. He was killed by Ashwatthama in the Kurukshetra War.

Arjuna 

Arjuna is  also known as Partha and Dhananjaya is a character in the Mahabharata. Arjuna was the son of Pandu and Kunti in the Kuru Kingdom. He was the spiritual son of Indra. He was the 3rd of the Pandava brothers and was married to Draupadi, Ulupi, Chitrāngadā and Subhadra at different times. His 4 children included Iravan, Babruvahana, Abhimanyu and Srutakarma. Arjuna was Atimaharathi class warrior. He was a cousin and best friend of Lord Krishna. He was the best archer and the greatest warrior of Mahabharata. He defeated many warriors like Ashwatthama, Kripa,Karna,Bhisma and Drona. And he killed many great warriors like Bhisma, Karna, bhurishrawa. He had record of defeating Devas, Gandharvas and Asuras

Aruni
In the Mahabharata, Aruni appeared in the Adi Parva. Aruni was a disciple of sage named Dhaumya. Once a flood took place in the fields of the ashram (school). A breach was formed in the embankment. Dhaumya sent Aruni to stop the water from entering the embankment. After a long time, Aruni had not returned. So, Dhaumya went out to find Aruni. The latter lying in the breach of the embankment to prevent the water from entering it. Because of his loyalty, Aruni is also known as Gurubhakta Aruni.

Ashvins

The Ashvins or Ashwini is a pair of twin gods. Their father is Surya and his mother is Saranyu. They are the gods of medicine and health. In the epic, Kunti felt bad for Madri as she didn't have any children due to a curse and shared her secret mantra with her. Madri, using the mantra, called the Ashwini and had one pair of  twins, Nakula and Sahadeva.

Ashwatthama 

Ashwatthama was the son of guru Drona and the grandson of the sage Bharadwaja. Ashwatthama possessed the celestial weapon Narayanastra (which no one possessed in the Mahabharat era). He used Narayanastra and killed 1 akshouni of the Pandava army. Ashvatthama fought on the Kaurava side against the Pandavas in the Kurukshetra War. He became a Chiranjivi (immortal) due to a curse on him by Lord Krishna after he shot the Brahmashirastra over Uttara's womb. Ashvatthama was appointed as the final commander-in-chief of the Kauravas in the Kurukshetra War. Overcome with grief and rage, he slaughters most of the Pandava camp in a single night offensive.

Astika

Astika was a rishi, and he was a son of Jaratkaru by the serpent goddess Manasa – a sister of the great serpent king Vasuki. He saved the life of a serpent Takshaka, the king of snakes, when the king Janamejaya organized a snake sacrifice known as Sarpa Satra, where he made great sacrifices of serpents, to avenge for the death of his father Parikshit.

Avantini
She was the wife of Shalya and the mother of Madranjaya, Rukmanagada, and Rukmanaratha. She was the princess of Avanti.

Ayu
Ayu or Ayus was an ancestor of Shantanu. He was a son Pururavas and his apsara wife, Urvashi. He married Prabha, an asura princess (daughter of Swarbhanu). He was succeeded by his son Nahusha.

Ayodhaumya 
Ayodhaumya/ Dhaumya was a sage of Avanti. He had three disciples namely Aruni of Panchal, Upamanyu and Veda. He even accompanied the Pandavas into the forest of Kurujangala during their exile. He sang songs of Sama Veda referring to Yama.

B

Babruvahana 

Babruvahana was one of the sons of Arjuna, begotten through Chitrangada, the princess of Manipur. During the Ashvamedha yagna, he killed his father Arjuna without knowing his identity. But Arjuna's other wife Ulupi brought back his life with the help of Nagamani.

Bahlika

Bahlika, also spelled as Vahlika, was the king of Bahlika kingdom in the Mahabharata, the elder brother of Shantanu, who was a king of Hastinapur and the uncle of Bhishma. He was the oldest warrior to fight in the Mahabharata war. He had a son, Somadatta, and grandson, Bhurishravas, who along with him fought on the side of the Kaurava army in the Kurukshetra War. He was slain by Bhima on the 14th day of the war when it continued after sunset. According to Yudhishthira, Bahlika's only wish was that there should be peace among the Bhāratas.

Bakasura 

Bakasura was a demon who was killed by Bhima near the city of Ekacakrā.

Balarama 

Balarama was the elder brother of Krishna. He is also known as Baladeva, Balabhadra, Haladhara and Halayudha. He was the son of Vasudev and Rohini. He was the incarnation of the great serpent God Seshnag. He is described as an extremely powerful warrior. He taught both Duryodhana of the Kauravas and Bhima of the Pandavas the art of fighting with a mace.

Banasena
He was a son of Karna. He was an excellent Mace-wielder. On the 16th day of the war, Karna was fighting with Bhima. When Bhima was about to stab Karna, Karna's son Banasena came in aid of his father. On seeing Banasena, Bhima got angered as his own son Ghatotkacha and nephew Abhimanyu were killed by Karna. Bhima killed Banasena by beating his chest, head, and abdomen regions in front of Karna. After seeing his son dead, Karna attacked Bhima. In the fight, Bhima almost took Karna to death. But Bhima spared Karna remembering Arjuna's oath of slaying Karna. Bhima asked Karna to take his son's body to perform funerals and later fight with Arjuna.

Bhadra and Madira
Bhadra and Madira were two wives of Vasudeva, the others being Rohini Devi and Devaki. Bhadra's children were Upanidhi, Gada, and others. Madira's children were Nanda, Upananda, Kritaka, and others. They cremated themselves with Vasudeva.

Bhadrakali 
Bhadrakali is the fierce form of Devi. To destroy Daksha yajna, She appeared with Veerabhadra. She also mentioned in Shalya Parva, when she was the one of followers of Kartikeya.

Bhagadatta 

Bhagadatta was the son of Naraka, king of the Pragjyotisha Kingdom and second in a line of kings of Naraka dynasty. He was succeeded by his son Vajradatta. He sided with Kaurava in the Mahabharata war as he was an enemy of Lord Krishna. He was killed by Arjuna on the 12th day of battle. In the war, he defeated great Pandava warriors including Drishtadyumna, Drupada, Matsya king Virata, Bhima.

Bhanu 
He was the son of Shri Krishna and Satyabhama. He was the father of Bhanumati (not to be confused with Duryodhan's wife). According to the regional folklore, he married Yudhishthira and Draupadi's daughter, Suthanu and had a son named Vajra.

Bharadwaja

Bharadwaja was a sage with divine powers. He was one of the sons of God Brihaspati. Once he was visiting Haridwar, where he saw Ghritachi, an Apsara, bathing in river. He was filled with desire and discharged his seed. It fell into a pot and Drona was born. Bharadwaja trained his son and Drupada.

Bharata 

Bharata is an ancestor of the Pandavas and the Kauravas in the Sanskrit epic Mahabharata. Though the Bhāratas is a prominent community in the Rigveda, the story of Bharata is first told in the Adi Parva of the Mahabharata, wherein he is the son of Dushyanta and Shakuntala. According to the epic, Bharata was a Chakravartin.

Bhima

Bhima is the 2nd born of the Pandavas. He was the son of Pandu and Kunti and spiritual son of Vayu. The Mahabharata relates many events which portray the might of Bhima. Physically, Bhima was the strongest person on Earth after Hanuman and Balarama. Bhima killed demons including Bakasura, Hidimbasura, Kirmira, Jatasura, etc. Bhima defeated and killed fearsome warrior Jarasandha. Bhima also slew Krodhavanshas, demon Maniman, and Kichaka. In Kurukshetra war, Bhima alone killed 100 Kaurava brothers. He was considered to have the physical strength of 10,000 elephants approximately. Bheema was an invincible wrestler and invincible mace fighter.

Bhima of Vidarbha 
In the Vana Parva of the epic, sage Markandeya narrated the story of Nala and Damayanti. Bhima was the king of Vidarbha and the father of Damayanti.

Bhishma 

Originally named as 'Devavrata', he was the eighth son of the Kuru King Shantanu and the river goddess Ganga. Bhishma was blessed with a boon from his father that he could choose the time of his death or he may remain immortal till he desires. He was related to both the Pandavas and the Kauravas through his half-brother, Vichitravirya (Son of Satyavati). He was one of the best archers and one of the greatest warriors of his time and he was trained by Lord Parashurama. On one of the occasions, he gave a tough fight to Parashurama- no Kshatriya achieved this feat.

Bhrigu 

Sauti said in the Pauloma Parva that Bhrigu was the son of Brahma. He was married to Puloma, who gave birth to Chyavana. When the demon Puloma was carrying off his wife Puloma, she gave birth to his son, Chyavana, by whose brightness the demon was burnt into ashes. When Bhrigu saw his wife crying, he asked the reason. Puloma stated that Agni had said to the demon Puloma that I was the girl with whom Puloma was betrothed. In anger, Bhrigu cursed Agni to engulf everything whether pure or impure.

Bhurishravas

Bhurishravas was the son of Somadatta and the grandson of Bahlika, hence making him the cousin of Dhritarashtra, Pandu, and Vidura. Bhurishravas had 2 brothers – Bhuri and Shala. Bhurishravas, in the Kurukshetra War, is known to have a rivalry with Yadava general Satyaki. Bhurishravas is eventually killed by Satyaki in the War.

Budha

Budha is the illegitimate son of Chandra, the moon god, and Tara, wife of Brihaspati. He met Ilā and married her. From their union, a son was born, who was known as Pururava. Pururavas founded the great lunar dynasty.

C

Chandra

Chandra is the moon god. He is son of Anusuya and Atri. The Chandravanshi (lunar dynasty) is named after him as he started it. Chandra had an affair with Tara, Brihaspati's wife. From their union, Tara became pregnant with Chandra's son, Budha. Budha's son, Pururavas, was the first king of the lunar dynasty. Later, Chandra married Rohini and a son named Varchas was born.

Chandravarma Kamboja
Chandravarma Kamboja is the first Kamboja king mentioned by name in the Mahābhārata. He was an ancestor of Duryodhana's wife Bhanumati. He appears to have been an ancient very powerful and renowned (vikhyaat) ruler of the Kambojas. He finds mention in the Adiparva section of the epic Mahābhārata, where he is stated to be an Asura or a demonic ruler.

Gandharva King Chitrasena

Chitrasen appeared twice in the epic. Chitrasena was the King of the Gandharvas who prevented the Kauravas from putting up their camp near the pond where he himself had encamped.

Chitrasena was also introduced in the epic in the Vana Parva, as a teacher of music by Indra. Indra foresaw that Arjuna would have to spend one year at King Virata's palace as a eunuch, during which time he would need the knowledge of music and dance. He wanted Arjuna to be trained by the king of the Gandharvas, Chitrasena. Chitrasena began his classes soon and the two also became good friends. When Urvashi cursed Arjuna to remain a eunuch for life, it was Chitrasena along with Indra who mediated with her to reduce the tenure of her curse to a single year. Chitrasena was able to achieve this by narrating to her the story of the Pandavas and the bravery of Arjuna.

Chekitana
Chekitana was the son of Kekaya king Dhrishtaketu and Queen Shrutakirti, a Yadava. Chekitana was described to be a valorous warrior, who fought with warriors like Susharma, Kripacharya and Dronacharya. He also rescued Nakula from the clutches of Duryodhana. On the 18th day, he was killed by Duryodhana.

Chitra and Chitrasena
Chitra and Chitrasena were brothers and the 2 kings of the Abhisara Kingdom. Both of them sided with the Kauravas in the Kurukshetra War. Chitra was killed by Prativindhya on the 16th day, whereas Chitrasena was killed by Shrutakarma on the same day.

Chitrāngada

Chitrāngada was a king in ancient India. In the Mahabharata, he is the elder son of Shantanu and Satyavati, ascending the throne of Hastinapura after his father's death. However, he is killed by a Gandharva named Chitrāngada soon after that.

Gandharva Chitrāngada
Chitrangada was a Gandharva, who was jealous of Shantanu's son Chitrāngada, for sharing a name. One day, the Gandharva challenged the prince and killed him.

Chitrāngada of Kalinga
Chitrāngada was the king of the Kalinga kingdom. In the Shanti Parva of the epic, Narada narrated that Chitrangada's daughter (Bhanumati) with Kaurava Duryodhana. After him, Srutayudha became the king of Kalinga as he had no son. Possibly, his wife was Chandramudra.

Chitrāngadā 

Chitrāngadā was the warrior princess of Manipura. She was the only heir of king Chitravahana and one of Arjuna's consorts. She had a son named Babhruvahana with him. Later, Babhruvahana unknowingly killed his father but was revived by Ulupi, Chitrāngadā's friend, and co-wife.

Chitravahana
He was the king of Manipura and the father of Chitrangadaa. He was also the grandfather of Babruvahana. His wife was Queen Vasundhara.

D

Damayanti

Damayanti is a character in a love story found in the Vana Parva book of the Mahabharata. She was a princess of the Vidarbha Kingdom, who married King Nala of the Nishadha Kingdom. Her story is set long before the Kurukshetra War.

Dantavakra 

Dantavakra was the king of Karusha according to the Mahabharata and the Puranas.

Danda and Dandadhara 
Danda and Dandadhara is the two princes of Magadha Kingdom. They fought the side of Kauravas and killed by Arjuna during Kurukshetra war.

Dashraj
Dashraj, also spelled Dasharaja, also known as Kevatraj, was the fisherman chieftain of Hastinapura and the father of Satyavati. He was the one who asked Satyavati's heir to be the ruler of Hastinapura, due to which Bhishma took a vow of celibacy and a vow not to rule Hastinapura.

Darada 
Darada is the king of Bahlika Kingdom. Shushipala eulogized him when he was born the earth was cleaved because of his weight.

Devaki 

Devaki was the daughter of Ugrasena, the stepsister of Kansa, wife of Vasudeva Anakadundubhi, the biological mother of Lord Krishna.

Devayani

Devayani was the daughter of Shukra, the guru of the Asuras. She was married to Yayati and gave birth to two sons — Yadu and Turvasu, and a daughter Madhavi. Before her marriage, she once fell in love with Brihaspati's son, Kacha. However, Kacha later refused to marry her. She had a friend named Sharmishtha who was secretly in relationship with her husband Yayati.

Devika
Devika is a minor character in the Mahabharata. She was the daughter of Govasena, the king of the Sivi Kingdom, and the second wife of Yudhishthira they got married in a self choice ceremony. They had a son called Yaudheya.

Dhrishtadyumna

Dhrishtadyumna was the son of Drupada and the brother of Draupadi, Shikhandi, and Satyajit in the epic Mahabharata. He had 4 sons – Kshatradharman, Kshatravarman, Kshatranjaya, and Dhrishtaketu. He was the commander-in-chief of the Pandava army during the entire Kurukshetra War i.e. for 18 days. Dhrishtadyumna killed Drona, the royal guru, when he was meditating which was against the rules of engagement.

Dhritrashtra 

In the epic Mahabharata, Dhritarashtra is the King of Kuru Kingdom with its capital Hastinapur. He was born to Vichitravirya's first wife Ambika. Dhritarashtra was born blind and became father to 100 sons and one daughter Dushala by his wife Gandhari (Gāndhārī), and another son Yuyutsu by Sughada, his wife's maid. These children, including the eldest son Duryodhana, came to be known as the Kauravas.

Dhrishtaketu of Chedi
Dhrishtaketu was the son of Chedi king Shishupala, who was a cousin of Krishna. Dhrishtaketu became the king of Chedi after his father's death and became an ally of the Pandavas. His sister Karenumati was married to Nakula. Dhrishtaketu and his brothers and sons participated in the Kurukshetra War, where they all were killed.

Dhrishtaketu of Kekeya
Dhrishtaketu was the ruler of Kekeya, and his wife was Shrutakirti, a Yadava who was the daughter of Shurasena. Many of Dhrishtaketu's sons participated in the Kurukshetra War, participating on both sides. Vrihadkshatra and Chekitana were 2 of his notable sons. Dhrishtaketu's daughter Bhadra was married to Krishna, who bore him many sons.

Draupadi 

Draupadi also referred to as Panchalī, is the most important female and one of the most important characters in Mahabharata. She was born from a yajna organized by Panchala King Drupada and is described to be the most beautiful woman of her time. She was the common wife of the Pandavas, who fought their cousins, the Kauravas in the great Kurukshetra War. She had five sons from each Pandava, who were collectively addressed as the Upapandavas.

Drona 

In the epic Mahabharata, Droṇa or Droṇāchārya was the royal preceptor to the Kauravas and Pandavas. He was a friend of Guru Sukracharya, the guru of Asuras, including Mahabali. He was the son of rishi Bharadwaja and a descendant of sage Angirasa. He was a master of advanced military arts, including the divine weapons or Astras. He was also the second commander- in- chief of kaurava army from 11th day to 15th day. He was beheaded by Dhrishtadyumna when he was meditating to  release his soul on the battlefield.

Drupada 

Drupada was the son of King Prishata. He was the king of the land of Southern Panchala. His capital was known as Kampilya. He was father of Shikhandi, Satyajit, Dhrishtadyumna and Draupadi. He was friend turned rival of Droṇa and rivalry developed when he humiliated Droṇa in front of his ministers. Later, with the help of Arjuna, Droṇa took half of Drupada's kingdom. This led Drupada to perform a yajna from which Draupadi and Dhrishtadyumna emerged. He was killed by Droṇa during the Kurukshetra War.

Durmasena 
Durmasena was the son of Dushasana. He helped his father many times in the Kurukshetra war. He was also present inside the Chakra Vyuh on the thirteenth day of the war. He was deprived of his chariot by Abhimanyu and saved by Aswathamma by cutting Abhimanyu's arrow in mid air. After that, Durmasena killed brutally injured Abhimanyu in a mace duel. On 14th day, Durmasena was brutally killed by Draupadi's sons, the Upapandavas, in revenge for Abhimanyu.

Duryodhana 

Duryodhana also is known as Suyodhana, is a major antagonist in Mahabharata and was the eldest of the Kauravas, the hundred sons of a blind king Dhritarashtra and Queen Gandhari. Being the firstborn son of the blind king, he was the crown prince of Kuru Kingdom and its capital Hastinapura along with his cousin Yudhishtra who was older than him. Karna was Duryodhana's closest friend.

Duryodhana's wife (Bhanumati)

Duryodhana's wifenamed Bhanumati in later retellingis a minor character is in Mahabharata, and mainly appears in the folk tales. She is unnamed in the epic, but it is described that she was the princess of Kalinga Kingdom and was the daughter of Chitrangada. She was abducted by Duryodhana with the help of his friend Karna. From Duryodhana, she is the mother of a son, Laxman Kumara, and daughter, Lakshmanaa. Bhanumati's mother-in-law Gandhari described her to Krishna in the posterior to the battle of Kurukshetra.

Durga 

Goddess Durga is also mentioned in the Mahabharata. In Virata Parva and Bhishma Parva of the epic, she was eulogized by Yudhishthira and Arjuna.

Dushala

Dushala was the daughter of Dhritarashtra and Gandhari, the sister of the Kauravas and the wife of Jaydrath. She was the only daughter of Gandhari from the 101 children.

Dushasana 

Dushasana was a Kaurava prince, the second son of the blind king Dhritarashtra and Gandhari and the younger brother of Duryodhana in the Hindu epic Mahabharata.

Dushyanta 

Dushyanta was an ancestor of Shantanu and a king of Hastinapura. He was the husband of Shakuntala and the father of the Emperor Bharata.

E

Ekalavya

Ekalavya (English: एकलव्य, ékalavya) is a character from the epic the Mahābhārata. He was a young prince of the Nishadha, a confederation of jungle tribes (Adivasi) in Ancient India.

G

Gandhari 

Gandhari is one of the prominent characters in the Indian epic the Mahabharata. She was a princess of Gandhara (modern-day Khyber-Pakhtunkhwa) and the wife of Dhritrashtra, the blind king of Hastinapura, and the mother of a hundred sons, the Kauravas.

Gandhari's maid
The chief maid of Gandhari—named Sughada in later retelling—was the mother of Yuyutsu. When Gandhari was pregnant for more than nine months, Dhritrashtra, in fear that there would be no heir, impregnated the maid. Later Gandhari gave birth to the 101 Kauravas and Sughada gave birth to Yuyutsu.

Ganesha

Ganesha is the god of beginnings. He is the son of Shiva and Parvati. The epic poem Mahabharata says that the sage Vyasa asked him to serve as his scribe to transcribe the poem as he dictated it to him. Ganesha agreed but only on the condition that Vyasa recites the poem uninterrupted, that is, without pausing. The sage agreed but found that to get any rest he needed to recite very complex passages so Ganesha would have to ask for clarifications.

Ganga 

In the Mahabharata, Ganga was the first wife of Shantanu, and the mother of heroic warrior-patriarch, Bhishma. When she met Shantanu for the first time, Shantanu asked her to become his wife. She agreed on the condition that he wouldn't ask her a single question. Later, she gave birth to 8 children, who were Vasus reborn as mortals due to a curse. Ganga drowned her seven sons as the Vasus requested her to do so. However, Shantanu stopped her from drowning their eighth son, who was Bhishma, and asked her questions. Ganga's condition was broken and she left Shantanu. However, she promised him to return his son. When Bhishma is mortally wounded in the Kurukshetra War, Ganga came out of the water in human form and wept uncontrollably over his body.

Ghatotkacha 

Ghatotkacha was the son of the Pandava Bhima and Hidimbi. His name comes from the fact that his head was hairless (utkaca) and shaped like a ghatam. He died in Kurukshetra War in the hands of Karna.

Ghritachi
Ghritachi is one of the prominent Apsara. In the Mahabharata, she appeared in Adi Parva. According to the story, she was bathing in a river. Bharadwaja was passing by, then he saw her. He was filled with desire and discharged his seed. It fell into a pot and Drona was born.

H

Hanuman

Unlike Ramayana, lord Hanuman doesn't have a large role in Mahabharata. He appears during the exile of Pandavas. In the story, Bhima, Hanuman's celestial brother, performed a penance to gain more strength. Hanuman wanted to test Bhima and appeared as a normal monkey in front of him. The monkey asked Bhima to lift his tail if he believed in his strength. But, Bhima wasn't able to lift the tail. Later, he realised who the monkey was and apologized. Hanuman taught battle-skills to Bheema for some time.

Hayagriva 

Hayagriva was an horse headed avatar of Lord Vishnu. He incarnated to slay the demons named Madhu and Kaitabha and brings the Vedas to Brahma.

Hidimb 

Hidimba was a Rakshasa and the brother of Hidimbi. He was killed by Bhima, who later married his sister.

Hidimbi 

Hiḍimbī or Hiḍimbā was a Rakshasi in the Mahābhārata. Hidimbi, along with her brother, Hidimba, tried to eat the Pandavas, when they entered their forest. But when she met Bhima, she fell in love with him and told them the plan. After Bhima killed Hidimba, Hidimbi married Bhima and gave birth to Ghatotkacha.

I

Ila

Ila or Ilā was a character from Mahabharata who could change his/her gender. As a woman, she married Budha, son of Chandra, and had a son named Pururavas. Pururavas's descendants founded the lunar dynasty.

Indra

In the epic, Indra appears numerous times. He is son of Kashyapa and Aditi. He is the spiritual father of Arjuna. He was the reason for the separation of Urvashi and Pururavas. During his temporary absence, Nahusha took his place as the king. He is called by Kunti after Dharmaraj and Vayu. Later in the epic, he is shown protecting Takshaka's forest from Arjuna. The Pandavas named their capital, Indraprastha, after him. During the exile of Pandavas, Arjuna came to meet him. During the Kurukshetra war, he took the indestructible armor and earrings from Karna and gave him a powerful weapon. These were some of his appearances in the epic.

Iravan

Iravan also is known as Aravan and Iravat is a minor character in Mahabharata. He was a son of Pandava prince Arjuna (one of the main heroes of the Mahabharata) and the Naga princess Ulupi, Iravan is the central deity of the cult of Kuttantavar which is also the name commonly given to him in that cult—and plays a major role in the cult of Draupadi. Iravan played a huge role in the Kurukshetra War. On the 7th day, he massacred the Kaurava army and killed many brothers of Shakuni. However, on the 8th day, in a battle of many illusions and magical powers, Iravan is beheaded by the demon Alambusha.

J

Jambavati

Jambavati is second of the Ashtabharya, the eight principal queen-consorts of Krishna. She was the only daughter of the bear-king Jambavan. Krishna married her, when he defeated Jambavan to retrieve the stolen Syamantaka jewel.

Janamejaya

Janamejaya was a Kuru king and a descendant of Arjuna. He was the son of Parikshit and the grandson of Abhimanyu and Uttarā. He performed a snake sacrifice called Sarpa Satra to avenge his father's death, who was killed by Takshaka, Arjuna's naga enemy. Astika, son of Manasa, stopped the sacrifice.

Janapadi
Janapadi is an Apsara, who once roamed in the forests. One day, upon seeing her, Shardavan, son of Gautama Maharishi discharged his seed. From his seed, Kripa and Kripi were born.

Jara
Jara was a demoness. When King Brihadratha's queen threw away their half-born child, Jara joined the two halves. The child was named Jarasandha.

Jarasandha 

According to the Hindu epic Mahabharata, Jarasandha was a powerful king of Magadha. He was a descendant of a king Brihadratha, the creator of the Barhadratha dynasty of Magadha. He was killed by 2nd Pandava Bhima.

Jaratkaru 

Jaratkaru was a sage who wandered all over the earth and remained unmarried. He encountered his ancestors who hung upside down, leading to hell for he did not have any son. This led to his marriage with the snake goddess, Manasa. They gave birth to Astika who saved the snakes from being burnt during the snake sacrifice.

Jatasura 
According to the Vana Parva of Mahabharata, Jatasura was a demon. He attacked the Pandavas in there exile.  Then Bhima killed him.

Jayadratha 

Jayadratha was King of Sindhu Kingdom. He was the son of King Vridhakshtra. He was married to Kauravas' only sister and only daughter of Dhritarashtra and Gandhari, Dushala. He kidnapped Draupadi on Duryodhana's order but was stopped by Arjuna and Bhima. His hairs were cut off as a punishment. He was the biggest reason for Abhimanyu's death. Abhimanyu's father Arjuna swore to kill Jayadratha and he fulfill his oath.

Jayatsena 
Jayatsena is the son of Jarasandha and king of Magadha. He is stated as one of the powerful kings of the time, who could be summoned to the cause of the Pandavas, before Kurukshetra war. He accepted that and came with an Akshauhini on the side of Pandavas.

K

Kadru 

Kadru was the daughter of Daksha and wife of Kasyapa. She was the mother of thousand nāgas. She even cursed her children for not obeying her to be burnt in the snake sacrifice.

Kaalvakra
He was the most loyal companion, commander-in-chief and main bodyguard of Kansa. He was always appreciated by Kansa. He was also cruel like Kansa. When Krishna was killing Kansa, Balarama killed him by beating him and cutting his head with hands.

Kalaratri 

Kalaratri is the seventh among the Navadurgas. She is stated in Sauptika Parva. When she appears to the Pandava soldiers in dreams, she appears amidst the fighting during an attack by Drona's son Ashwatthama.

Kalki 

Kalki is the final incarnation of the preserver deity, Vishnu. He is stated in Vana Parva of the epic, to incarnate at the end of the Kali Yuga and protect dharma, by destroying the sinners and Mlecchas.

Kacha 

Kacha's story is mentioned in Mahabharata's Adi Parva. He was the son of Brihaspati. He was sent by Devas to Sukracharya's ashram to learn about Mrita Sanjeevani mantra. Sukra's daughter Devyani fell in love with him. However, Kacha later refused to marry her.

Kamsa 

Kamsa or Kansa was the tyrant ruler of the Vrishni kingdom with its capital at Mathura. He is the brother of Devaki, the mother of the god Krishna who later slew Kamsa.

Kanika 
Kanika was a sage of Hastinapur. He acted as a counselor to Dhritarashtra. When Yudhisthira was announced the crown prince, Dhritarashtra became sad for his sons were deceived. And at this time Kanika was summoned to counsel the king, who advised Dhritarashtra not to resort to fight but remove his foes secretly. Unethical methods may also be adopted for killing a foe, was his advice. Then he narrated a story of a jackal, who deceived his companions (tiger, mongoose, wolf, and mouse) by tricking them. Influenced by his counsels Dhritarashtra exiled the Pandavas to Varanavata and constructed the house of lac.

Karenumati
Karenumati was the daughter of Chedi king Shishupala, and sister of his successor Dhrishtaketu. She was the wife of Pandava Nakula and begot him a son, Niramitra. Niramitra succeeded his father Nakula to the throne of the Northern Madra Kingdom.

Karna 

In the epic, Karna is one of the main protagonists, he was the spiritual son of Surya (the Sun deity) and son of princess Kunti (later the Pandu's queen). He was raised by foster Suta parents named Radha and Adhiratha. Adhiratha was the charioteer and poet profession working for king Dhritarashtra. Karna grows up to be an accomplished warrior, a gifted speaker and becomes a loyal friend of Duryodhana. He is appointed the king of Anga (Bengal) by Duryodhana. Karna joined the Duryodhana's side in the Kurukshetra War and defeated many warriors like Bheem, Yudhishthir, Nakul, Sahadev, Bhagdatt, Jarasandh Ghatotkach. He was Maharatha (an equal to more than 5 maharathi).

Karna's adoptive brothers 
Adhiratha and Radha, the adoptive parents of Karna, had some biological children. Karna's adoptive brothers were killed during the Kurukshetra War. In later retelling, one of them is named Shon, who was killed by Abhimanyu on the 13th day of Kurukshetra War.

Karna's wives 

In the original Mahabharata, there are some mentions of Karna's wife. Her name is not revealed, though it is described that she belonged to Suta (charioteer) community. The names and stories appear in later texts and interpolation.

Kauravas

Kauravas were the 102 sons of Dhritarashtra. Out of which, 101 were his legitimate children from his wife Gandhari. He had one illegitimate son named Yuyutsu, who was conceived through a maid during Gandhari's two year long pregnancy. Out of these children, Dushala is the only girl. The names of the 102 Kauravas are

Kauravya
He was the father of Ulupi and grandfather of Iravan. His wife was Vishvahini.

Kichaka

Kichaka was the general of the Mastya kingdom. He was the brother of Sudeshna, queen of Matsya. He was very powerful and feared by Virata and the citizens of the kingdom. He was killed by Bhima when he tried to force himself on Draupadi.

Kirmira

Kirmira was a demon and younger brother of demons Alambhusha and Baka. When Pandavas and Draupadi went Kamyaka Forest, Kirmira encountered them and challenged Bhima for a fight as Bhima killed his brother Baka. After a tough fight, Bhima beheaded Kirmira.

Kratha 
Kratha is the Kshatriya king and the reincarnation of Rahu. He fought the side of Kauravas and killed by a Kulinda king during Kurukshetra war.

Kripa 

Kripacharya was the son of Śaradvān and Jānapadī, born in a particularly extraordinary manner. He was the grandson of Maharishi Gautama. He was a descendant of sage Angiras. He along with his sister Kripi were adopted by King Shantanu. Later on Kripa became an acharya, teacher of the royal children, giving him the name Kripacharya. His twin sister Kripi married Drona. Kripa was among the Maharathis who fought on the Kauravas's side against the Pandavas in the Kurukshetra war in the Hindu epic of the Mahabharata.

Kripi
Kripi was the sister of Kripacharya. She and her brother were adopted by the Rajguru of King Shantanu. Her actual parents were Saradvan and Janapadi. She married Dronacharya, who was poor at that time. When they wanted a powerful son, they prayed to Shiva, and a son named Ashwathama was born. Kripi is known to be a human manifestation of the powerful Goddess Tara.

Krishna 

Lord Krishna is a Hindu deity. He is also a major character in epic Mahabharata. He was an eighth avatar of lord Vishnu/Narayana. He was born to Devaki and her husband, Vasudeva of the Yadava clan in Mathura. During the Kurukshetra War, he became strategist of Padavas and charioteer of Arjuna. At the start of the Dharma Yudhha (righteous war) between Pandavas and Kauravas, Arjuna is filled with moral dilemma and despair about the violence and death the war will cause in the battle against his own kin. He wonders if he should renounce and seeks Krishna's counsel, whose answers and discourse constitute the Bhagavad Gita. Krishna counsels Arjuna to "fulfill his Kshatriya (warrior) duty to uphold the Dharma" through "selfless action".

Kritavarma 

Kritavarma was one of the Yadava warriors and chieftain, and a contemporary of Krishna. During Kuruksetra war, Kritavarma fought for Kauravas along with Krishna's Narayani sena and was one of survivors of the war.

Kunti-Bhoja
In Hindu mythology, Kunti-Bhoja (or Kuntibhoja) was the adoptive father of Kunti and cousin of Shurasena. He was the ruler of the Kunti Kingdom. Kunti was a daughter of King Shurasena but was later given to Kuntibhoja since he was devoid of children. Kuntibhoja raised her as his own daughter and loved her. She was very beautiful and intelligent and later married Pandu. When Kunti was a young girl, the sage Durvasa visited Kuntibhoja one day and sought his hospitality. The king entrusted the sage to Kunti's care and tasked Kunti with the responsibility of serving the sage and meeting all his needs during his stay with them. Eventually, the sage was gratified. Before departing, he rewarded Kunti by teaching her Atharvaveda mantras which enabled her to invoke any god of her choice to beget children by them. His son Visharada succeeded him who was killed by Duryodhana on the 8th day.

Kunti 

Kunti or Pritha was the daughter of Shurasena, and the foster daughter of his cousin Kuntibhoja. She was married to King Pandu of Hastinapur and was the mother of Karna and the Pandavas Yudhishthira, Bhima, Arjuna. She was the paternal aunt of Krishna, Balarama, and Subhadra. She was the step mother of Nakula and Sahadeva. She was very beautiful and intelligent.

Kuru
Kuru is the name of the ancestor of the clan of the Kurus in the Mahabharata. He was the son of Samvarana and of Tapati, the daughter of the Sun.

In the literature, Kuru is an ancestor of Pandu and his descendants, the Pandavas, and also of Dhritarashtra and his descendants, the Kauravas. This latter name derived as a patronym from "Kuru", is only used for the descendants of Dhritarashtra.

King Kuru had two wives named Shubhangi and Vahini. He had a son named Viduratha with Shubhangi, and five sons with Vahini, named Ashvavat, Abhishyat, Citraratha, Muni, and Janamejaya. Due to his merits and great ascetic practices the region "Kurujangal" was named after him. It has also been known as Kurukshetra since ancient Vedic times.

L

Lakshmana Kumara

In the Hindu epic Mahabharata, Laxman Kumara or simply Laxman is the son of Duryodhana, and grandson of Dhritarashtra. He had a twin sister called Lakshmanaa who was kidnapped by Samba (Krishna's son). Not much is revealed about Laxman in the Mahabharata.

Lakshmanaa
In the Bhagavata Purana, Lakshmanaa (also spelled Laxmanaa or Lakshmanā), also known as Lakshana, is the daughter of Duryodhana. Little is revealed about Laxmanaa in the text other than her marriage to Krishna's son Samba.

M

Madanjaya
He was Prime Minister of Kuru Kingdom before Vidura. When Bhishma gave his post to Vidura, he tried to kill Vidura but he fought and was beheaded by Bhishma.

Madranjaya
He was eldest son of Shalya and Avantini who was killed on 2nd day of war by Virata.

Madrasena
He was younger brother of Shalya and elder brother of Madri. He was uncle of Nakula and Sahadeva. He was unmarried and was killed by Yudhishthira along with Shalya on the last day of war.

Madri

In the Mahabharata epic, Madri, was sister of Shalya, princess of the Madra Kingdom, second wife of Pandu and the mother of two sons: Nakula and Sahadeva. One day, Pandu and Madri made love, this led Pandu to die due to his curse and Madri to commit suicide.

Malini 
She was maid of Draupadi married to a Kshatriyan soldier Pralanksena. Her son Nakusha was Bodyguard of Drupada. Her husband and son were killed by Drona before Drupada's death on the 15th day of war.

Manasa

In the Mahabharata, Naga Goddess Manasa is the wife of Jaratkaru. They had a son, Astika, who saved the serpents including Takshaka from Sarpa Satra organised by king Janamejaya to avenge his father's death.

Manimat 
Manimat or Maniman is the king who was the rebirth of Vritra, the son of Danayu. He fought the side of Pandavas and killed by Bhurishravas in the Kurukshetra war.

Marisha
Shurasena was married to a Nāga (or serpent) woman named Marisha. She bore all of his children and was the cause for Vasuki’s boon to Bhima. after whom the Surasena Kingdom or mahajanpada and the Yadava sect of  Surasenas  were named. She was the mother of Kunti and Vasudeva as well.

Markandeya

Markandeya was blessed by Lord Shiva to remain young till the end of Kali Yuga. In the Mahabharat, Markandeya visits the Pandavas during their exile and tells them the story of Nala and Damayanti, Savitri and Satyavan, etc.

Meghavarna
He was the son of Ghatotkach and Maurvi. He was the grandson of Bhima and Hidimbi. He was the brother of Anjanaparvana. He did not fight the War, and hence, was the only alive son of Ghatotkacha.

Menaka

Menaka was a beautiful apsara. She was sent by Indra to fill Vishwamitra with lust and destroy his penance. Upon seeing her, Vishwamitra was filled with desire and from their union, Shakuntala, mother of great king Bharat, was born. Menaka left Shakuntala and Vishwamitra again started to meditate. Shakuntala was left with sage Kanva.

Muchukunda 

Muchukunda, son of King Mandhata, and brother of equally illustrious Ambarisha, was born in the Ikshvaku dynasty. He later became a sage and his divine powers killed Kalyavana.

N

Nala

Nala is the main character of a love story in the Vana Parva of Mahabharata. He was king of Nishada. He fell in love with Damayanti and married her. But they struggled a lot after their marriage. His story is set long before the Kurukshetra war.

Nahusha

Nahusha was a king from lunar dynasty and an ancestor of Shantanu. He was the son Ayu and Prabha. He was equal to Indra in every way and was made the ruler of Swarga in Indra's absence. He married Ashokasundari/Viraja, the daughter of Devi Parvati and Lord Shiva, and had a son named Yayati. He was removed from his position as the king because of his arrogance and cursed to a snake. His curse was over when he met Yudhishthira in a forest.

Nakula 

Nakula was fourth of the five Pandava brothers. Nakula and Sahadeva were twins born to Madri, who had invoked the Ashwini Kumaras. Nakula and his brother Sahadeva, are both called as Ashvineya(आश्विनेय), as they were born from Ashvinas. Nakula was said to be a skilled master in sword-fighting. On the 18th day of Kurukshetra War, Nakula had killed three sons of Karna.

Nand

Nand was the head of the Gopas tribe of Yadava cowherds referred as Holy Gwals. He was a friend of Vasudev, spouse of Yashoda and the foster father of Krishna.

Narakasura 

Narakasura was the son of Bhumi, the earth goddess. He gained a boon that only his mother could kill him. He captured and married women forcefully. Lord Krishna and Satyabhama ( the human incarnation of Bhumi) killed him.

Niramitra
In the Hindu epic Mahabharata, Niramitra (Sanskrit: निरमित्र, lit. he who has no enemies) was the son of Nakula and his wife Karenumati.

P

Padmavati
Padmavati is the goddess who mentioned in Tantras. She also mentioned in Shalya Parva of the epic, as one of the followers of Kartikeya.

Parashara 

Parashara was a sage. He was the grandson of Vasishtha, the son of Śakti Maharṣi, and the father of Vyasa. Before Satyavati married  Shantanu, she had an affair with Parashara. During that time, she was known as Matsyagandha. Later they had a child named Vyasa. However they parted away but before leaving, Parashara restored Matsyagandha's virginity and gave her an enchanting scent.

Parashuram 

Parashuram is the sixth avatar of Vishnu in Hinduism and he is one of the chiranjeevis who will appear at the end of the Kali Yuga. He was born to destroy evil Kshatriya, who had begun to abuse their power. Parashurama is also the Guru of Bhishma, Dronacharya, and Karna.

Parikshit 

Parikshit was a king from kuru lineage. He was the son of Abhimanyu (Arjuna's son) and Uttarā. When he was in his mother's womb, he was attacked and killed by Ashwatthama using Brahmastra. However Shri Krishna revived him and named him Parikshit. After the Pandavas and Draupadi retired for heaven, he was crowned as the new king. Later, Kali (demon) manipulated Parikshit and he placed a dead snake on a meditating rishi. The Rishi's son saw it and cursed him to die by a snakebite. After he was bitten and killed by Takshaka, his son Janamejaya performed Sarpa Satra. This is where he hears the story of his great-grandfathers.

Pandu 

Pandu was the king of Hastinapur, the son of Ambalika and Vichitravirya. He is popularly known as the father of the Pandavas, who were called so after him. Pandu was responsible and a great warrior, who expanded his kingdom during his rule. He had two wives named Kunti and Madri. He died early due to a curse of a sage.

Pandya 
He is the king of Pandya Kingdom. He came to help the Pandavas with an army and also an maharathi on the side of Pandavas.

Paurava 
Paurava is a king and the rebirth of Asura Sarabha. He fought the side of Kauravas and killed by Arjuna during Kurukshetra war.

Prabha 
Prabha, sometimes Indumati, was the daughter of Asura Svarbhanu, who later became Rahu and Ketu. She married Ayu, son of Pururavas of lunar dynasty, and had a son named Nahusha.

Pradyumna 

Pradyumna was the son of Sri Krishna and Rukmini. He is the reincarnation of Kamadeva, who was burnt by lord Shiva for shooting arrow of love at him. After his birth, he was kidnapped by Sambara and thrown into water. However, he survived and was raised by Mayawati (reincarnation of devi Rati). Later, he defeated Sambara and returned to Dwarka. He married Mayawati, Prabhavati and Vidarbha princess Rukmavati, and had a son Aniruddha.

Pratipa

Pratipa was a king in the Mahabharata, who was the father of Shantanu and grandfather of Bhishma.

Prativindhya
Prativindhya was the son of Yudhisthir and Draupadi. He was the eldest brother among Upapandavas.

Prishati
Prishati (lit. daughter-in-law of Prishata) was the wife of King Drupada and the mother of Shikhandini and Satyajit. After Drupada performed a yajna (fire-sacrifice) to obtain a powerful son, she was asked by the sages to consume the sacrificial offering to conceive a child. However, Prishati had perfumed saffron in her mouth and requested the sages to wait till she had a bath and washed her mouth. The sages criticised her untimely request and poured the offering into the flames of the yajna, from which Dhrishtadhyumna and Draupadi emerged. Overwhelmed by their arrival, Prishati requested the sages to declared her as the mother of Dhrishtadhyumna and Draupadi.

Purochana
Purochana was the builder of the Lakshagraha. However, he, along with his wife and her sons, perished in the fire. He was the royal chief architect in Hastinapura. He was a friend of Shakuni and Duryodhana. Purochana built the Lakshagraha palace and burnt it. He was killed by Bhima in the Lakshagraha palace. Purochana had a wife and many sons. In his last life, Purochana had been Prahasta, Ravana's uncle and commander-in-chief of his army. Shakuni and Duryodhana made another plan to kill the Pandavas. Shakuni told Purochana to build a really beautiful palace in Varnavrata out of only materials that can catch and spread fire easily. Purochana quickly did as Shakuni had said. Purochana called the palace Lakshagraha. It was made out of materials such as wax and twigs.
After some time, Shakuni convinced the Pandavas and Kunti to visit Lakshagraha. Purochana and his wife welcomed the Pandavas and Kunti grandly. After 10 days, during the night, Purochana set fire on the palace. The Pandavas woke up and realized that this had been another one of Duryodhana and Shakuni's evil schemes. Bhima got really mad. While Purochana and his sons and wife were trying to escape, Bhima killed all of them, including Purochana. The Pandavas barely managed to escape the fire.

Pururavas

Pururavas was the first king from the lunar dynasty (Shantanu's dynasty). He was the son Budha, son of Chandra, and Ilā. He married princess of Kashi. Later, he married Urvashi but she left him. He was succeeded by his son, Ayu.

R

Radha
Radha was the foster mother of Karna, one of the central characters in the Hindu epic Mahabharata. She was the wife of Adhiratha, the charioteer of Bhishma. Radha also bore a son named Shon. The young Kunti used a mantra to beget a son from the Sun god Surya. Afraid of the taint of being an unwed mother, she placed the baby in a basket and set him afloat a river. The child later known as Karna was found and adopted by Radha and Adiratha, who raised Karna as their own. Karna is known by the matronymic Radheya. Karna, once he knows from Krishna and Kunti about his birth secret, having done so much harm to his brothers Pandavas, was in no position to abandon Duryodhana.

Revati

In Mahabharata, Revati was daughter of King Kakudmi and consort of Balarama, the elder brother of Krishna.

Rohini (wife of Vasudeva)

She was the wife of Vasudeva and mother of Balrama. She looked after Balaram in his childhood. After Vasudeva and Devaki were released, she started living with them. After the passing of Vasudeva in the Yadu massacre, Rohini cremates herself on Vasudeva's pyre along with his other wives Devaki, Bhadra and Madira.

Rochamana 
Rochamana was Kshatriya king of Aswamedha kingdom. He was a warrior on the side of Pandavas and killed by Karna in the Kurukshetra war.

Rukmi

Rukmi was the ruler of Vidarbha. He was the son of king Bhishmaka and elder brother of Rukmini.

Rukmini

Rukmini was the first and chief queen consort of Krishna. She was an avatar of goddess Lakshmi. She was the daughter of king Bhishmaka, sister of Rukmi and the princess of Vidarbha.

Ruru 
Ruru was a rishi(sage) of the epic Mahabharata. He was the son of Pramati and Ghritachi, the celestial danseuse and a descendant of Bhrigu. Ruru married Pramadvara, foster-daughter of sage Sthulakesha. He was the father of Sunaka.

S

Sahadeva 

Sahadeva was the youngest of the five Pandava brothers. Nakula and Sahadev were twins born to Madri who had invoked the Ashwini Kumaras. Sahadeva had two wives Draupadi and Vijaya. Draupadi was the common wife of Pandavas while Vijaya was the beloved wife of Sahadeva. Similar to his twin brother Nakula, Sahadeva was also accomplished in swordsmanship. On the 18th of war, Sahadeva had killed Shakuni who was mainly responsible for the Kurukshetra War.

Sahadeva of Magadha

Sahadeva was the son of powerful king Jarasandha. When Bhima slayed his father, Krishna declared him to be the new ruler of Magadha. Sahadeva is a frequent ally of the Pandavas, and attended the Rajsuya of Yudhishthira. During the Kurukshetra War, he fought from the side of Pandavas and was slayed by Shakuni.

Sakradeva 
He was son of King Srutayudha and Queen Sakrayani of Kalinga. He was Yuvaraja (Crown Prince) of Kalinga. He was killed by Bhima on the 2nd day of war along with many soldiers and two generals Satya and Satyadeva.

Samba 

Samba was the mischievous son of Krishna and his second wife, Jambavati. He was born as a boon of Lord Shiva. Samba was the husband of Lakshmanaa, Duryodhana's daughter. Later in the epic, his mischief becomes the reason for the destruction of Krishna's Yaduvansha, to whom Gandhari cursed.

Samudrasena 
Samudrasena is the Kshatriya king. Once, Bhima defeated Samdrasena and his son, Chandrasena during his Digvijaya. In Kurukshetra war, he fought the side of Pandavas and killed by Kaurava army.

Shamika 
Shamika was a sage in the epic Mahabharata. One day, while hunting Parikshit had wounded a deer but lost it in the woods. Searching for it, fatigued he asked meditating Shamika about the deer. The sage did not answer as he was observing the vow of silence. This angered the king, who placed a dead snake on Shamika's shoulder. Sringin, son of Shamika enraged by this act cursed Parikshit to be killed by Takshaka(snake) within seven days.

Samvarana

Samvarana was a king from lunar dynasty and an ancestor of Shantanu. He married Tapati, daughter of Surya, and had a child named Kuru.

Sanjaya 

Sanjaya was Dhritarashtra's advisor and also his charioteer. Sanjaya was a disciple of sage Krishna Dwaipayana Veda Vyasa and was immensely devoted to his master, King Dhritarashtra. Sanjaya – who has the gift of seeing events at a distance (divya-drishti) right in front of him, granted by the sage Vyasa – narrates to Dhritarashtra the action in the climactic battle of Kurukshetra, which includes the Bhagavad Gita.

Sarama 

Sarama, according to Mahabharata, is a celestial female dog. Janamejaya and his brothers beat one of her sons without any reason when the dog arrives at an occasion of sacrifice. This angers Sarama, and she curses the princes and Janamejaya that evil may happen to them.

Satrajit

In the Hindu scriptures like the Mahabharata and Bhagvata Puran, Satrajit was a Yadava king who was a great devotee of Suryadeva, the Sun god. He is famous for his role in the story of Syamantaka gem. He was the father of Satyabhama, who was Bhumidevi's incarnation and Sri Krishna's third wife.

Satyabhama

Satyabhama is the third consort of the God Krishna, the eighth avatar of the god Vishnu. Satyabhama is believed to be an avatar of Bhumī Devī, the Goddess of Earth who is Prakriti form of Mahalakshmi. She aided Krishna in defeating the demon Narakasura. Later she visited the Pandavas during their exile and had a chat with Draupadi.

Satyajit 
He was second born child of King Drupada and Queen Prishati. He was younger brother of Shikhandini/Shikhandi and elder brother of Dhrishtadyumna and Draupadi. He succeeded the throne of Panchala.

Satyaki 

Yuyudhana, better known as Satyaki, was a powerful warrior belonging to the Vrishni clan of the Yadavas, to which Krishna also belonged. Satyaki was also student of Arjuna due to which he fought on Pandavas side.

Satyavati 

Satyavati is the matriarch of the Mahabharata. She was a fisherwoman before her marriage with Shantanu. She along with her father, Dashraj, proposed the conditions which led Bhishma to take his vow. With Shantanu, she is the mother of Chitrangada and Vichitravirya. She is also the mother of the Vyasa, author of the epic, whom she called for Niyoga when Vichitravirya died without any heir.

Savitri and Satyavan 

In the Mahabharata, Savitri and Satyavan are characters appearing in the Vana Parva of the epic.  Savitri is a princess born by the boon of Savitra. She is wise and beautiful. She fell in love with Satyavan, a prince who is destined to die at very young age. Savitri, knowing that she would become a widow at a young age, married Satyavan. The later part of the story is about how Savitri's love and wit saves her husband from Yama, god of death.

Senavindu 
Senavindu also called as Senabindu is a Kshatriya king and the rebirth of Asura Tuhunda. Arjuna two times defeated this king during Digvijaya. He is stated by Drupada as one of kings, who could be summoned to the cause of the Pandavas, before Kurukshetra war. He was killed by Kauravas in the Kurukshetra war.

Shakuni 

Shakuni was the prince of Gandhara Kingdom in present-day Gandhara, later to become the King after his father's death. He is the main antagonist in the Hindu epic Mahabharata. He was the brother of Gandhari and hence Duryodhana's maternal uncle. Shakuni was killed by Sahadeva on the 18th day of the Kurukshetra War.

Shakuni's wife (Arshi)
Shakuni's wife was the queen of Gandhara and the mother of Uluka. In later retellings she is named Arshi and is also known as Arsh and Charulata.
Her brothers Keturaja and Ketusena were killed by Drupada on the 11th day of the war. She was very close to her sister-in-law, Gandhari.

Shakuntala 

Shakuntala was wife of Dushyanta and the mother of Emperor Bharata. Her story is told in the Mahabharata and dramatized by many writers, the most famous adaption being Kalidasa's play Abhijñānaśākuntala (The Sign of Shakuntala).

Shalva
Shalva was the king of Shalva kingdom. He and Amba, the princess of Kashi, fell in love and Amba decided to choose him during her Swayamvara. However, Bhishma won the princesses for his brother Vichitravirya. When, Amba told Bhishma about her love, he sent her with honour to Shalva. But, Shalva rejected her and told her that he cannot marry her as she was won by Bhishma.

Shalya 

In the epic Mahabharata, King Shalya was the brother of Madri (mother of Nakula and Sahadeva), as well as the ruler of the Madra kingdom. Shalya, a powerful spear fighter and a formidable charioteer, was tricked by Duryodhana to fight the war on the side of the Kauravas. On the last day of the Kurukshetra War, Yudhishthira killed him during a spear fight.

Shankha
Shankha was 3rd son of King Virata. He was killed by Bhishma on very first day of war.

Shantanu 

Shantanu was a Kuru king of Hastinapura in the epic Mahabharata. He was a descendant of the Bharata race, of the Lunar dynasty and great-grandfather of the Pandavas and Kauravas. He was the youngest son of King Pratipa of Hastinapura and had been born in the latter's old age. He was husband of Ganga and Satyavati. He was father of Devavrat (Bhishma), Chitrāngad and Vichitravirya.

Sharmishtha
 
Sharmishtha was an Asura princess and a spouse of Yayati, an  ancestor of Shantanu.

Shatanika
Shatanika was the son of Nakula and Draupadi. He was the third brother among Upapandavas.

Shaunaka 
Shaunaka headed the sages during their conclave at his twelve-year sacrifice, where Ugrashravas Sauti recited the Mahabharata.

Shikhandi 

Shikhandi was born as a baby girl, named "Shikhandini," to Drupada, the king of Panchala, and his wife. Later she changed her sex and took the name Shikhandi. He fought in the Kurukshetra war for the Pandavas along with his father Drupada and brother Dhristadyumna. He was Kashi's Amba in previous birth.

Shishupala 

Shishupala was the son of Damaghosha. He was slain by his cousin Krishna, at the great coronation ceremony of Yudhishthira in punishment for the opprobrious abuse made against his august personage. He was also called Chaidya, being a member of Chedi kingdom.

Shrutkarma
Shrutkarma was the son of Arjuna and Draupadi. He was the youngest brother among Upapandavas.

Shrutsena
Shrutsena was the son of Sahadeva and Draupadi. He was the fourth brother among Upapandavas.

Shukracharya

Shukracharya is the son of sage Bhrigu and his wife Kavyamata. After the Devas killed his mother (who was later revived), Shukra developed a deep hatred towards the Devas and became the guru of Asuras. He had a daughter named Devayani, who was married to Lunar king Yayati. But Yayati developed an affair with Devayani's maid, Sharmishtha. This led Shukra to curse Yayati to lose his youth.

Shveta
He was second son of Virata. He was killed on the first day of war by Shalya.

Shvetaki
Shvetaki was a king who performed numerous Yajnas. He is the reason of the destruction of Khandava (Khandava-Dahana).

Sons of Karna
Karna's sons were Vrishasena, Vrishaketu, Banasena, Chitrasena, Satyasena, Sushena, Shatrunjaya, Dvipata and Prasena. All except for Vrishaketu were killed in the war.

Sons of Shalya
Shalya and Avantini's three sons were Madranjaya, Rukmanagada and Rukmanaratha. Madranjaya was the eldest than other two with a gap of 10 years. Rukmanagada and Rukmanaratha were twins. Madranjaya was killed on 2nd day of war by Virata and other two were killed by Abhimanyu inside the Chakravyuha on 13th day.

Sons of Shishupala
The four sons of Chedi King Shishupala were Dhrishtaketu, Mahipala, Suketu, Sarabha. They had a sister named Karenumati who was younger than Dhrishtaketu but elder than other three. Dhrishtaketu succeeded the throne of Chedi after Shishupala's death. Dhrishtaketu was killed by Dronacharya on 6th day of war and other three were killed by Shakuni's son Vrikaasur.

Sreniman
Sreniman was a Kshatriya king. He ruled the Kumaradesa, Nakula defeated him during his Digvijaya. In Kurukshetra war, he fought the side of Pandavas and killed by Drona.

Subala
Subala was father of Shakuni and Gandhari. He was King of Gandhara and later King-Father under Shakuni's rule. He was husband of Sudharma.

Subhadra

In the epic, she is the sister of Krishna and Balarama, wife of Arjuna and mother of Abhimanyu and grandmother of Parikshit. She is the daughter of Vasudeva and Rohini. When Arjuna visited Dwarka, he fell in love with Subhadra and ran away with her. Hindus believe Subhadra to be a goddess named Yogmaya.

Sudakshina

Sudakshina (Sanskrit: सुदक्षिण) was a king of the Kambojas, and fought on the side of the Kauravas in the Kurukshetra War.

Sudeshna

Sudeshna was the wife of King Virata, at whose court the Pandavas spent a year in concealment during their exile. She was the mother of Uttara, Uttarā, Shveta and Shankha. She had a younger brother named Kichaka and a brother-in-law named Sahtanika.

Sunaka 
Sunaka was the son of Sage Ruru and Pramadvara. this royal sagwas a member of Yudhishthira's assembly. He get a sword from king Harivansa and he giving it to king Ushinara.

Surya

Surya is the god of sun and day. He is son of Aditi and Kashyapa. He is consort of Saranyu. In the epic, he was the first god called by Kunti using the mantra given by sage Durvasa to obtain a child. She did it out of curiosity and gave birth to Karna, who was born with indestructible armour and earrings. During that time she wasn't married and had to abandon the child. Later in the epic, Surya gave Akshaypatra to Yudhishthira.

Sutsoma
Sutsoma was the son of Bhima and Draupadi. He was the second brother among Upapandavas.

Svaha

Svaha is the daughter of Prajapati Daksha and the wife of Agni. In the Vana Parva, sage Markandeya narrated her story to the Pandavas. As per the story, Agni visited the ashram of the seven Saptarshi and saw their wives. He was attracted towards them but none responded to him. Svaha was present there and was attracted to Agni, but he wasn't. Later Agni went to forest to calm down his mind. Svaha, taking the form of the wives of sages (except for Arundhati), slept with Agni one by one. Later Agni realised Svaha's love and married her.

T

Takshaka 

Takshaka was the king of nagas. He lived in a city named Takshasila, which was the new territory of Takshaka after his race was banished by Pandavas led by Arjuna from the Khandava Forest and Kurukshetra, where they built their new kingdom. Because of this, he made a fierce rivalry with Arjuna. During the Kurukshetra war, he sat on an arrow of Karna which was shot at Arjuna. However Krishna saved Arjuna. After his failure, Takshaka vowed to end Arjuna's lineage. After the Pandavas and Draupadi left for heaven, Takshaka killed Parikshit.

Tapati

Tapati is a river goddess. She is daughter of Surya and Chhaya. She married Samvarana and had a child named, Kuru. Kuru was an ancestor of Shantanu.

Tilottama 

In the Hindu epic Mahabharata, Tilottama is described to have been created by the divine architect Vishwakarma, at Brahma's request, by taking the best quality of everything as the ingredients. She was responsible for bringing about the mutual destruction of the Asuras, Sunda and Upasunda. Even gods like Indra are described to be enamoured by Tilottama. Her story was told by sage Narada to the Pandavas as he wanted to tell them how a woman can lead to rivalry between brothers.

Tara

Tara is the goddess of felicity. She is spouse of Brihaspati, a guru of gods. Brihaspati often ignored Tara and she started to have an affair with Chandra, the moon god. From their union, Budha was born, whose son, Pururavas, founded the lunar dynasty.

U

Usha 

Uṣā or Usha was daughter of Banasura, powerful king of Sonitpur and a devotee of Lord Shiva. Later Usha was married to Aniruddha, grandson of Lord Krishna.

Ugrasena

Ugrasena (Sanskrit: उग्रसेन) is a Yadava king in Mahabharata epic. He was the king of Mathura, a kingdom that was established by the powerful Vrishni tribes from Yaduvanshi clan. Lord Krishna was the grandson of Ugrasena. He established his grandfather as the ruler of Mathura again after defeating his uncle, King Kamsa who was a wicked ruler. Before this, King Ugrasena was overthrown from power by his own son Kansa and was sentenced to prison along with his daughter Devaki and son in law Vasudeva to prison. Devki and Vasudev were parents of Lord Krishna.

Ugrashravas Sauti

Ugrashravas Sauti was the son of Lomaharsana. He was the Lomaharshana. He was a disciple of Vyasa. He was the narrator of Mahabharata and several Puranas before the gathering of the sages in Naimisha Forest.

Uluka 

Uluka was eldest son of Shakuni and Arshi. He was sent as messenger to Pandavas by Duryodhana. He was killed by Sahadeva on 18th day of war before his father's death.

Ulupi 

Ulupi was daughter of Kauravya, the king of Nāgas, she was among the four wives of Arjuna. She had a son named Iravan.

Urvashi

Urvashi was a celestial maiden in Indra's court and was considered the most beautiful of all the Apsaras. She was the consort of Pururavas, an ancestor of Pandavas and Kauravas. Later she left him and returned to heaven. When Arjuna came to heaven to meet Indra, she fell in love with him. But Arjuna refused her as he thought her as his mother.

Uttamaujas

In the epic Mahabharata, Uttamaujas was a powerful Panchala warrior. He is described to be a protector of Arjuna. With his brother Yudhamanyu, they fought a battle against Duryodhana. He was killed during Ashwatthama's night raid. Sometimes, he is described to be Drupada's son and identified with Satyajit.

Uttanka

In the Mahabharata, Uttanka is described as the disciple of the sage Gautama. In both legends, he is a learned sage who goes through many hurdles in procuring the earrings demanded by his guru's wife as the fee for the teacher (gurudakshina).

Uttara 

Uttara Kumar was the prince of Matsya Kingdom and the son of King Virata, at whose court the Pandavas spent one year in concealment during their exile. His sister Uttarā was given in marriage to Abhimanyu, son of Arjuna.

Uttarā 

Uttarā or Anglicized as Uttaraa (उत्तरा) was daughter of King Virata, at whose court the Pandavas spent a year in concealment during their exile. She was sister of Prince Uttara. She was wife of Abhimanyu and mother of Parikshit.

V

Vajra 

He was the son of Aniruddha. Vajra was crowned as the King of Indraprastha on the request of Krishna by the Pandavas after the Yadava fratricide just before the Pandavas' exile.

Vajranabh 
Vajra in the Vayu Purana and the Harivamsa, described as the son of Bhanu, the eldest son of Krishna and Satyabhama. He had a sister named Bhanusammati.

Valandhara 
Valandhara was the princess of the Kashi Kingdom, daughter of King Devesha and wife of Pandava Bhima. They both had a son Sarvaga, who became the King of Kashi after the Kurukshetra War. Sarvaga's granddaughter Vapusthama married Janamejaya, the great-grandson of Arjuna, and bore him 2 sons – Shatanika and Sahashranika.

Vapusthama 
Vapusthama was the princess of Kashi, the grand-daughter of King Sarvaga and great-granddaughter of Bhima, the 2nd Pandava. Vapusthama was married to Arjuna's great-grandson Janamejaya, and bore him 2 sons – Shatanika and Sankukarna.

Varaha 

Varaha is the boar-incarnation of god Vishnu. He is stated in Vana Parva of the epic, when he rescued Bhudevi during the Mahapralaya (great-flood).

Vasudeva 

Vasudeva the father of the Hindu deities Krishna, Balarama and Subhadra. He was king of the Vrishnis and a Yadava prince. He was the son of the Yadava king Shurasena. His sister Kunti was married to Pandu.

Vasundhara 
She was the queen of Manipura and the mother of Chitrangada. She was also the grandmother of Babruvahana. Her husband was King Chitravahana.

Vayu 

Vayu deva is the god of wind. He is son of Aditi and Kashyapa. In the epic, he is the spiritual father of Hanuman and the Pandava, Bhima. He was the second god called by Kunti after her marriage using a mantra as her husband couldn't conceive due to a curse.

Veerabhadra 

Veerabhadra was the fierce god who incarnated from Lord Shiva to destroy Daksha's yajna. He is also stated in Shanti Parva of the epic Mahabharata.

Vichitravirya 

Vichitravirya (Sanskrit: विचित्रवीर्य, vicitravīrya) was a king in Indian Religious Texts. In the Mahabharata he was the younger son of queen Satyavati and king Shantanu and grandfather of the Pandavas and Kauravas.

Vidura 

In the epic Mahabharata, Vidura is described as the prime minister of the Kuru Kingdom and also the uncle of the Pandavas and Kauravas. He was born from Niyoga- between sage Vyasa and Parishrami, a handmaiden to the queens- Ambika and Ambalika.

Vidura's wife (Sulabha)
The wife of Vidura, the half-brother of King Dhritarashtra and the Prime Minister of Hastinapur. She was also a chaste woman of supreme order. She too had a high degree of devotion and abdication. When Lord Krishna visited Hastinapur as an emissary of Pandavas, he had not accepted Duryodhana's request to stay in his palace but instead he chose to stay at Vidura's home and accepted a simple meal there. She is named Sulabha in later versions of the Mahabharata.  Sulabha was a great devotee of Lord Krishna. One day he came to her home for a surprise meal. She was enchanted by his glowing face. In absence of her husband, she offered him peels of banana instead of the fruit. And he  ate them respecting her bhakti note.

Vijaya 
In the Hindu epic Mahabharat, Vijaya was the daughter of king
Dyutimata of Madra and wife of Sahadeva. They got married in a self choice ceremony. Vijaya was Nakula's maternal uncle's daughter. They had a son Suhotra. After the Kurukshetra War, Vijaya and Suhotra lived in Madra, when Sahadeva was appointed as the king of Madra Kingdom.

Vikarna 

Vikarna was third Kaurava, son of Dhritarashtra and Gandhari and a brother to the crown prince Duryodhana. Vikarna is universally referred to as the third-most reputable of Kauravas. Usually, he is also indicated as the third-oldest son, but in other sources, the "third-strongest" reputation remained and it is implied that Vikarna is just one of Gandhari's 99 children (after Duryodhana and Dussasana). Vikarna was the only Kaurava who questioned the humiliation of Draupadi, the wife of his cousin Pandavas after they lost her in a game of dice to Duryodhana.

Vinata 

Vinata, was the mother of Aruna and Garuda (the birds). She was also the daughter of Daksha and wife of sage Kasyapa.

Vinda and Anuvinda 
Vinda and Anuvinda were brothers, and the two kings of Avanti. They were the sons of Jayasena and Rajadhidevi. They also had a sister, Mitravinda, who married Lord Krishna. They were good friends of Duryodhana, and fought for his cause in the Kurukshetra War.

Viraja 
In the Harivamsa, (an appendix of Mahabharata), the spouse of Nahusha is mentioned to be Viraja, the daughter of Pitrs. Later, she was replaced by Ashokasundari, the daughter of goddess Parvati and lord Shiva.

Virata 

In the epic, Virata was the king of Matsya Kingdom with its Virata Kingdom, in whose court the Pandavas spent a year in concealment during their exile. Virata was married to Queen Sudeshna and was the father of Prince Uttara and Princess Uttarā, who married Abhimanyu, the son of Arjuna.

Vishoka 
Vishoka was the charioteer of Pandava Bhima during the Kurukshetra War.

Vrihanta 

Vrihanta was king of the Ulukas. His name appears at several places in the Mahabharata.

Vridhakshtra
He was former king of Singhu Kingdom. He was father of Jayadratha and Vijayadratha. He later became a rishi. When Arjuna beheaded his son Jayadratha, his head came on his lap while he was dping Tapasya and when he stood up and Jayadratha's head blasted, killing Vridhakshtra.

Vrishaketu 

Vrishaketu is a figure in the Sanskrit epic Mahabharata. He was the son of King of Anga Karna and his chief consort Maharani Supriya also youngest and surviving son  of Karna and Arjuna teaches him many more skills of great warrior. Later, he becomes King of Anga.

Vrishasena 

Vrishasena was the son of Karna and Vrishali. With his father, he entered battle field on the 11th day of Kurukshetra war and fought for Kauravas. He was killed by Arjuna.

Vyasa 

Vyasa was the author of epic Mahabharata. According to the Mahabharata, the sage Vyasa was the son of Satyavati and Parashara. He was also the surrogate father of Dhritarashtra, Pandu and Vidura. They were born through Niyoga. Later, he helped in birth of 101 children of Dhritarashtra and Gandhari.  He also helped the Pandavas many times.

Y

Yama or Dharma

In the epic, the death god Yama often identified with the god Dharmais the spiritual father of Yudhishthira. He was the first god called by Kunti after her marriage using a mantra as her husband couldn't conceive. Yama also appeared in the tale of Savitri and Satyavan. In the story, he tried to take Satyavan's soul, but Savitri tricked him. Dharma, later in the epic, appears testing Yudhishthira by taking form of a Yaksha. When the Pandavas and Draupadi went for heaven, he accompanied them by taking form of a dog and was only surviving left along with Yudhishthira. At the end, he showed his true form to Yudhishthira.

Yamuna 

Devi Yamuna or Yami is the river goddess of life. She is daughter of Surya and Saranyu as well as the twin of Yamraj. In the epic, she appears as Kalindi. She is one of  lord Krishna's eight wives.

Yashoda

She is the wife of Nanda (head of Gokul) and foster mother of Lord Krishna and Balarama. She is  popularly and best known as Mother of Krishna. Krishna and Balarama spent their childhood with Yashoda and Nanda and the couple took care of them. There is a popular story about replacement of Krishna with Yashoda's daughter  by Vasudeva after an agreement with Nanda.

Yaudheya
Yaudheya was the son of Yudhishthira and Devika, and the grandson of Govasena, who was the king of Sivi Kingdom. Yaudheya succeeded his grandfather after his death in the Kurukshetra War.

According to the Matsya Purana, Yaudheya is also the name of the son of Prativindhya, however he does not succeed Yudhishthira to the throne of Hastinapur as he inherits his maternal kingdom.

Yayati

Yayati was an ancestor of Shantanu and the son of king Nahusha and Ashokasundari, the daughter of goddess Parvati. He had two wives, Devayani and Sharmishtha.

Yogmaya 

Yogmaya or Vindhyavasini is an incarnation of goddess Adi Parashakti. She was the daughter of Yashoda and Nanda, the foster parents of Krishna. Krishna and Yogmaya were born on the same day. They were exchanged by their parents to save Krishna from Kamsa. Many believe that Subhadra was her reincarnation.

Yudhisthira 

Yudhishtira was the first among the five Pandavas and was blessed by death god Yama to Pandu and Kunti. He became the king of Indraprastha and later of Hastinapura (Kuru). He was the leader of the successful Pandava side in the Kurukshetra War. At the end of the epic, he ascended to heaven. He was also blessed with the spiritual vision of second sight by a celestial Rishi as a boon.

Yuyutsu 

Yuyutsu was the illegitimate son of Dhritarashtra with Dasi aka Sughada/Sauvali, his wife Gandhari's maid. He was the paternal half – sibling to Gandhari's children: Duryodhana and the rest of the 100 Kaurava brothers and their sister Dushala. Eventually, he was the only son of Dhritarashtra who survived the Kurukshetra war.

Notes

References

Sources

External links 

People related to Krishna
Javanese mythology
Wayang
Lists of character lists
Lists of people associated with religion